Bernhard "Bernd" Kast (born 8 September 1948) is a former West German male canoeist who won nine medals at senior level the Wildwater Canoeing World Championships.

Achievements

References

External links
 Sport vor 50 Jahren: Bernd Kast, der Herr der Stromschnellen 

1948 births
Living people
German male canoeists
Sportspeople from  Augsburg